North Street is a hamlet in the parish of Ropley in Hampshire, England. The hamlet lies on the A31 road from Alton to Winchester.

Etymology
North Street is first recorded in 1347 as 'North st.' . Later spellings are 'Northstreete''' in 1521 and 'Northstrete' in 1568. The name derives from Old English 'strǽt', ''meaning a settlement around a road or lane. The 'north' element refers to its placement north of Ropley.

History
North Street is one of the few areas of Ropley where Romano-British settlement is known. It is unclear what sort of settlement, but metal detecting groups have uncovered a large amount of Roman finds, including pottery, coins, brooches and masonry, both to the Northeast and west of the hamlet. There is also a Romano-British enclosure recorded here.

Notable buildings
Manor Farmhouse, a late 18th century building with later expansions and with brick walls in Flemish bond.
Turnpike Cottage, a 17th-century cottage with later 18th century additions.
Ropelia Cottage, a 17th-century cottage with late 20thcentury renovations.
North Street Farmhouse, a 1730 cottage with a 1925 casement.

References

Villages in Hampshire